The Zhob Brigade was an infantry formation of the Indian Army during World War II. It was formed in November 1920, for service on the North West Frontier. During World War Two it was normal practice for newly formed battalions to be posted to the North West Frontier for service before being sent to Africa, Burma or Italy.

Formation
These units served in the brigade during World War II
Hodson's Horse (4th Duke of Cambridge's Own Lancers)
1/2nd Gurkha Rifles
2/4th Gurkha Rifles
4/10th Baluch Regiment
5/5th Mahratta Light Infantry
2/9th Jat Regiment
1/1st Gurkha Rifles
Nabha Akal Infantry
2/11th Sikh Regiment
Shri Nath Regiment, Nepal
4th Gwalior Maharaja Bahadur's Own Battalion
6/2nd Punjab Regiment
3/2nd Gurkha Rifles
4/5th Mahratta Light Infantry
6/7th Rajput Regiment
14/9th Jat Regiment
15/6th Rajputana Rifles
15/5th Mahratta Light Infantry
4th Jammu and Kashmir Infantry
6/18th Royal Garhwal Rifles
5/4th Bombay Grenadiers
7/11th Sikh Regiment
9/9th Jat Regiment
6/3rd Madras Regiment
7/19th Hyderabad Regiment
5/2nd Gurkha Rifles
5/9th Gurkha Rifles
7/14th Punjab Regiment

See also

 List of Indian Army Brigades in World War II

References

British Indian Army brigades